Coleophora gymnocarpella is a moth of the family Coleophoridae. It is found in Morocco, Algeria, Tunisia, Iran and the United Arab Emirates.

The larvae feed on the leaves of Gymnocarpon fruticosum.

References

gymnocarpella
Moths described in 1907
Moths of Asia
Moths of Africa